Robert Ladd Eastaugh (born November 12, 1943) is an American lawyer and jurist who served on the Alaska Supreme Court from 1994 to 2009. He is the grandson of R. E. Robertson and was formerly in private practice associated with the law firm founded by his grandfather.

Born in Seattle, Washington, Eastaugh received a BA in English literature from Yale University, and a J.D. from the University of Michigan Law School. In 1993, when potential nominees were being vetted for the supreme court seat, Eastaugh was one of the two most popular candidates among Alaska lawyers surveyed by the state bar association. He retired from the court in 2009.

In 2020, Eastaugh was recalled to the court to fill in for recused Chief Justice Joel Bolger, in a political case.

References

1943 births
Living people
Lawyers from Seattle
People from Juneau, Alaska
Yale College alumni
University of Michigan Law School alumni
Justices of the Alaska Supreme Court